Francis Arinze  (born 1 November 1932) is a Nigerian cardinal of the Catholic Church. He was Prefect of the Congregation for Divine Worship and the Discipline of the Sacraments from 2002 to 2008 and before that led the Secretariat for Non-Christians (later renamed the Pontifical Council for Interreligious Dialogue) from 1984 to 2002.

He has been a cardinal since 1985 and the Cardinal Bishop of Velletri-Segni since 2005. Arinze was one of the principal advisors to Pope John Paul II and was considered papabile at the papal conclave that elected Pope Benedict XVI in 2005.

Early life
Arinze was born in the tiny village of Eziowelle, Anambra, Nigeria, to a family of peasant farmers who practiced a local indigenous religion. He followed a brother in converting to Catholicism and he was baptized on 1 November 1941, his ninth birthday, by Father Michael Tansi, who was beatified by John Paul II in 1998. His parents later converted to Catholicism as well. At age 15, he entered All Hallows Seminary of Onitsha and graduated with a philosophy degree in 1950. His father initially opposed his entering the seminary, but encouraged him when he saw how he enjoyed it. Arinze stayed at All Hallows until 1953 to teach. In 1955, he went to Rome to study theology at the Pontifical Urban University, where he earned a doctorate in sacred theology summa cum laude.

Priest
On 23 November 1958, at the chapel of the university, Arinze was ordained to the priesthood by Cardinal Gregorio Pietro Agagianian, pro-prefect of the Sacred Congregation for the Propagation of the Faith.

After ordination, Arinze remained in Rome, earning a master's in theology in 1959 and doctorate in 1960. His doctoral thesis on "Ibo Sacrifice as an Introduction to the Catechesis of Holy Mass" was the basis for his reference work, "Sacrifice in Ibo Religion", published in 1970. From 1961 to 1962, Arinze was professor of liturgy, logic, and basic philosophy at Bigard Memorial Seminary in Enugu. He was then appointed regional secretary for Catholic education for the eastern part of Nigeria. He was then transferred to London, where he attended the Institute of Education and graduated in 1964.

Bishop and archbishop 
On 6 July 1965, Pope Paul VI appointed him titular bishop of Fissiana and coadjutor to Charles Heerey, archbishop of Onitsha, Nigeria. Arinze became the youngest Roman Catholic bishop in the world when Heerey consecrated him on 29 August 1965, at the age of 32. He attended the final session of the Second Vatican Council in 1965. Heerey died on 6 February 1967, and Pope Paul appointed Arinze to succeed him as archbishop on 26 June 1967. He was the first native African to head this archdiocese.

The Nigeria-Biafra War broke out just days after Arinze was named archbishop. The entire archdiocese was located in the secessionist Biafran territory. Arinze fled to Adazi and then Amichi until the war ended in 1980. Arinze spent these years aiding refugees and with the help of foreign missionarieso supervised what one international relief worker called one of "the most effective and efficient distributions of relief materials" in history. He kept the Church independent of the warring factions. 

At the end of the war, the Nigerian government deported all foreign missionaries stationed in the archdiocese, leaving only the native clergy and religious, who were few in number. The government also confiscated the Catholic schools, most of which also served as churches or parish halls.

He was president of the Nigerian Bishops Conference from 1979 to 1984.

Impressed by Arinze's ability to work with Muslims, Pope John Paul II on 8 April 1984 appointed Arinze pro-president of the Secretariat for Non-Christians, later renamed the Pontifical Council for Interreligious Dialogue. Arinze continued as the ordinary of his archdiocese.

In 1985, he was awarded the chieftain's title of the Ochudouwa of Eziowelle.

On 9 March 1985, Arinze resigned from his post in Onitsha.

Cardinal
Pope John Paul named Arinze Cardinal-Deacon of San Giovanni della Pigna in the consistory held on 25 May 1985. After ten years he exercised his option to be raised to the rank of cardinal-priest, which Pope John Paul approved on 29 January 1996. Two days after he became a cardinal, Arinze was appointed president of the Secretariat for Non-Christians, which was renamed the Pontifical Council for Interreligious Dialogue in 1988.

He served in various related capacities including the president of the Special Assembly for Africa of the Synod of Bishops. He also received honours in this capacity: On 24 October 1999 he received a gold medallion from the International Council of Christians and Jews for his outstanding achievements in inter-faith relations. He traveled extensively and became a popular speaker in the United States.

Arinze was a member of the Committee of the Great Jubilee of the Year 2000. In that capacity, he worked closely with individual bishops and priests throughout the world in preparation for the rare celebration of the Church. On 1 October 2002, Pope John Paul named him prefect of the Congregation for Divine Worship and the Discipline of the Sacraments.

When Pope John Paul died on 2 April 2005, all major Vatican officials – including Arinze – automatically lost their positions. He was considered papabile, that is, a candidate for election to the papacy, at the papal conclave that followed, in which he was a cardinal elector. He returned to his post as prefect of the Congregation for Divine Worship when confirmed by Pope Benedict XVI on 21 April 2005, and on 25 April Benedict named him Cardinal Bishop of Velletri-Segni.

On 9 December 2008 Benedict accepted Arinze's resignation as prefect of the Congregation of Divine Worship.

In retirement
Arinze remains active and in 2009 gave the commencement address at the Augustine Institute in Denver. He actively catechises via Familyland TV to the Americas, the Philippines, Africa, and Europe. He has produced over 1,700 television programs with the Apostolate for Family Consecration. The programs cover almost all of Pope John Paul II's encyclicals and apostolic letters, Vatican II, and many other topics. In July 2009, he delivered a major speech promoting interreligious dialogue at The City Club of Cleveland. He is also the author of several books along with a complete "Consecration and Truth Catechetical Program" for children and adults.

In May 2018, he addressed the ongoing controversies about granting access to the Eucharist. He objected to any interpretation of Pope Francis' Amoris Laetitia that would allow a Catholic remarried without an annulment to receive communion as an act of mercy saying that Christ saw that condition as adultery and "We cannot be more merciful than Christ." With respect to the proposal endorsed by many German bishops to allow the Protestant spouses of Catholics to receive communion, he said that it was not a question of "hospitality" and the celebration of Mass is "not an ecumenical service". He would say to such a Protestant: "Come, be received into the Church, and then you can receive Holy Communion seven times a week. Otherwise no."

Honors
He has received honorary degrees from the University of Nigeria, Nsukka, in 1986, Catholic University of America in 1998, Wake Forest University in 1999, Catholic University of Manila in 2001, Notre Dame University in 2003, University of St. Mary of the Lake in 2003, and Seton Hall University in 2005.

On 5 October 2021, a center for peace and reconciliation was established in Arinze's name in Nigeria.

Publications
 The Evangelizing Parish (Ignatius Press, 2018)
 The Family Catechism on Tape, Apostolate for Family Consecration
 Divine Providence: God's Design in Your Life (2005)
 Building Bridges: Interreligious Dialogue on the Path to World Peace (2004)
 Cardinal Reflections: Active Participation and the Liturgy (2005)
 The Holy Eucharist (Our Sunday Visitor, 2001) 
 The Church in Dialogue: Walking With Other Believers (1990)
 Meeting Other Believers: The Risks and Rewards of Interreligious Dialogue (1998)
 Celebrating the Holy Eucharist (2006)
 Religions for Peace (Darton, Longman & Todd, 2002)
 God's Invisible Hand: The Life and Work of Francis Cardinal Arinze, Ignatius Press, 2006
 Great Figures in Salvation History: David and Solomon, an interview with Cardinal Arinze and Roy Schoemann, Ignatius Press, 2006
 Sacrifice in Ibo Religion (University of California Press, 1970)

Notes

References

External links

Xclusive 20 minutes with Cardinal Arinze

1932 births
Living people
People from Anambra State
Nigerian cardinals
Igbo theologians
Converts to Roman Catholicism from pagan religions
Participants in the Second Vatican Council
Members of the Congregation for Divine Worship and the Discipline of the Sacraments
Pontifical Council for Interreligious Dialogue
Cardinals created by Pope John Paul II
Pontifical Urban University alumni
Roman Catholic archbishops of Onitsha